César Alberto Carranza (born 16 August 1980) is a retired Argentine footballer, who played as a forward.

Career

Carranza started his professional career in 2001 with Nueva Chicago. In 2005, he spent time on loan to Mexican clubs Real Colima and Querétaro FC. He joined Gimnasia y Esgrima de Jujuy in 2007.

In late 2008 he was acquired by Colo Colo, defending Chilean Champion. In June 2009 he was loaned to Everton de Viña del Mar and in January 2010 he was again loaned, this time to Godoy Cruz in Argentina.

External links
 Football-Lineups player profile
 

1980 births
Living people
Footballers from Buenos Aires
Argentine footballers
Argentine expatriate footballers
Association football forwards
Chilean Primera División players
Argentine Primera División players
Primera Nacional players
Primera B Metropolitana players
Nueva Chicago footballers
Gimnasia y Esgrima de Jujuy footballers
Godoy Cruz Antonio Tomba footballers
Aldosivi footballers
Club Atlético Lanús footballers
Colo-Colo footballers
Everton de Viña del Mar footballers
Club Atlético Belgrano footballers
Querétaro F.C. footballers
Ferro Carril Oeste footballers
Gimnasia y Esgrima de Mendoza footballers
Barracas Central players
San Telmo footballers
Club Atlético Ituzaingó players
Argentino de Merlo footballers
Expatriate footballers in Mexico
Expatriate footballers in Chile
Argentine expatriate sportspeople in Mexico
Argentine expatriate sportspeople in Chile